Pelargonium inodorum, commonly known as wild pelargonium, is a flowering plant in the family Geraniaceae. It is grows in New South Wales, Queensland, Tasmania, Victoria, New Zealand (including the Chatham Islands). It has scented leaves and mostly pink flowers.

Description

Taxonomy
Pelargonium inodorum was first formally described in 1804 by Carl Ludwig von Willdenow and the description was published in Hortus Berolinensis.

Distribution and habitat
Wild pelargonium is a widespread species found growing in moist low lying areas to montane woodlands in New South Wales, Queensland, New South Wales, Victoria and the Australian Capital Territory.

References

inodorum
Flora of New South Wales
Flora of Queensland
Flora of Tasmania
Flora of Victoria (Australia)
Flora of New Zealand
Flora of the Chatham Islands
Plants described in 1804
Taxa named by Carl Ludwig Willdenow